The 1923 Middle Tennessee State Normal football team represented the Middle Tennessee State Normal School (now known as Middle Tennessee State University) during the 1923 college football season. The team captain was Bob King.

Schedule

References

Middle Tennessee State Normal
Middle Tennessee Blue Raiders football seasons
Middle Tennessee State Normal football